The Supreme Court of Judicature Act 1877 (40 & 41 Vict c 9) was an Act of the Parliament of the United Kingdom enacted to provide the structure of the ordinary judges of the Court of Appeal, the appellate division of the High Court of Justice and the Lord Justices of Appeal in England and Ireland.

In England, the Act established the number of judges at five (5) and their salaries.

The whole Act was repealed by section 226(1) of, and the Sixth Schedule to, the Supreme Court of Judicature (Consolidation) Act 1925.

See also
Judicature Act

References
Robert William Andrews and Arbuthnot Butler Stoney. "Judicature Act, 1877". The Supreme Court of Judicature Acts, and the Appellate Jurisdiction Act, 1876. Reeves & Turner. Chancery Lane, London. 1880. Page 89. Second Edition. 1883. Page 103.
Charles Burney, Montague Johnstone Muir Mackenzie and Charles Arnold White. "Supreme Court of Judicature Act, 1877". Wilson's Practice of the Supreme Court of Judicature. Seventh Edition. Stevens and Sons. Chancery Lane, London. 1888. Pages 93 and 94.
Thomas Snow, Charles Burney and Francis A Stringer. "The Supreme Court of Judicature Act, 1877". The Annual Practice 1905. Sweet and Maxwell. Stevens and Sons. London. 1905. Volume 2. Pages 511 and 512.
Thomas Snow, Charles Burney and Francis A Stringer. "The Supreme Court of Judicature Act, 1877". The Annual Practice 1909. Sweet and Maxwell. Stevens and Sons. London. 1909. Volume 2. Pages 571 and 572. See also pages 451 to 453, 461, 567, 569, 570, 574, 575, 580, 581, 603. See also volume 1, pages 5, 868 and 1067.

Acts of the Parliament of the United Kingdom concerning England and Wales
United Kingdom Acts of Parliament 1877
Acts of the Parliament of the United Kingdom concerning Ireland
High Court of Justice
Court of Appeal (England and Wales)